Agit 883 56 51, later shortened to Agit 883, was an anarchist newspaper in the left-wing West Berlin scene. It ran from February 1969 to February 1972. The number in the title was the telephone number of the editorial office, which was co-editor Dirk Schneider's flat at Uhlandstraße 52 in Berlin-Wilmersdorf.

In June 1970, Agit 883 published the Red Army Faction manifesto.

Further reading

External links

References 

Publications disestablished in 1972
Publications established in 1969
Red Army Faction
Anarchist periodicals
German-language newspapers